The Diocese of Cassano all'Jonio is a Roman Catholic diocese in Calabria.

History

It is not known when Cassano became an episcopal See. Some place the establishment in the 5th century, though without supporting evidence.

In 859 Cassano and Cosenza were the headquarters of the Gastaldates of the Lombards of the Duchy of Benevento.  In their turn the Lombards were attacked again and again, as were the Greeks in south Italy, by the Saracens (Arabs and Moors). The Greeks were able to drive the Saracens away, and reorganized Calabria as part of the Greek Empire and the Greek Church of Constantinople. Cassano was established around this time as a suffragan diocese of the Greek Metropolitan of Reggio Calabria.

In 1059 mention is made of a bishop of Cassano, whose name is not reported.  He was engaged, along with the Provost of Gerace, in resisting the advance of the Normans, led by Robert Guiscard and his brothers. A battle took place against Count Roger at San Martino in Valle Salinarum, in which the Greeks, led by the bishop of Cassano, were defeated.

In 1096 we read of a bishop of Cassano known as Saxo (Sassone), who was a Vicar of Pope Urban II and Pope Paschal II in the region. In the 11th century, the diocese became a suffragan of Reggio Calabria. Pope Paschal II (1099–1118), however, granted the Church of Cassano complete immunity from the jurisdiction of the Metropolitanate of Reggio Calabria, and took it directly under the protection of the Holy See. On 20 October 1144, King Roger II of Sicily confirmed the privileges of the Church of Cassano.

On February 13, 1919, the diocese had territory transferred to create the Eparchy of Lungro for the Italo-Albanian Catholic Church.  On January 30, 2001, the Archdiocese of Cosenza-Bisignano was elevated to a metropolitan see with Cassano all'Jonio as a suffragan diocese.

Seminary
In accordance with the decrees of the Council of Trent, Bishop Serbelloni (1561–1579) appointed a committee to plan the creation of a seminary for the diocese of Cassano. The seminary was formally created by a decree of Bishop Carafa on 6 March 1588, and in 1593 Bishop Audoeno (Owen Lewis) fixed the number of scholars at twelve, and for the next century the number never exceeded twenty. The seminary was perpetually short of funds.

Cathedral
The old cathedral was consecrated by Bishop Tomacelli on 3 May 1491. The bell tower was completed by Bishop Gaetano in 1608. The new cathedral was consecrated on 22 March 1722 by Bishop Francesco Maria Loyerio of Umbriatico. The decoration of the Choir was completed in 1750. The stucco façade of the cathedral was completed by Bishop Coppola in 1795, and the marble pulpit installed. Many of the treasures of the cathedral were stolen or damaged during the revolutionary period 1798–1806.

The Cathedral was governed by a Chapter, composed (in 1752) of four dignities and eighteen Canons.  The dignities were: the Archdeacon, the Dean, the Cantor and the Treasurer.

Bishops

Diocese of Cassano all’Jonio

to 1300
...
Thomas (attested April 1171 – April 1174)
Ignotus (1179–1181)
...
Goffredus (attested 1195)
Terricius (attested 1220, 1221, 1223)
Biagio (c. 1233 or 1235)
Giovanni de'Fortibracci (21 January 1252 – after 1254)
Giordano Russo (c. 1266–1267)
Marco d'Assisi, O.Min. (20 April 1268 – 1282/1285) 
...
Pasquale (c. 1282)
Richardus Tricarico

1300–1500

Guglielmo de Cuna, O.Min. (28 February 1301 – )
Alberto Bizozio (attested 1312)
Joannes
Giovanni da Mafino (18 March 1329 – 1334)
Landulfus Vulcani (24 October 1334 – 1334/1335)
Gunius
Durandus
Rogerius Quadrimani (January 1348 – 1348)
Giovanni da Papasidero (17 March 1348 – 1373)
Marino del Judice (18 May 1373 – 1379)
Andreas Cumanus (26 January 1379 – ) (Avignon Obedience)
Carlo Corsini (2 December 1383 – ) (Avignon Obedience)
Robertus (1378– ) (Roman Obedience)
Nicolaus (c. 1383) (Roman Obedience)
Petrus (1 October 1392 – 1399)
Phoebus de Sanseverino (1 December 1399 – 1404)
Marino Scannaforcie (11 November 1404 – 1418?)
Antonello dei Gesualdi, O.Celest. (23 November 1418 – 1428?)
Belforte Spinelli (1432 – 12 December 1440)
Giovanni Francesco Brusato  (8 December 1463 – 22 March 1476)
Bartolomeo del Poggio (22 March 1476 – 1485 Died)
Nicola Tomacelli  (1485–1490 Died)
Marino Tomacelli  (1491–1519 Died)

1500–1700

Cardinal Domenico Giacobazzi  (1519–1523 Resigned) (Administrator)
Cristoforo Giacobazzi (23 March 1523 – 7 October 1540 Died)
Durante Duranti  (1541–1551)
Bernardo Antonio Michelozzi de' Medici (1551–1552 Died)
Giovanni Angelo de' Medici  (1 March 1553 – 25 June 1556)
Mark Sittich von Hohenems Altemps  (29 May 1560 – 17 December 1561)
Giovan Battista Serbelloni (17 December 1561 – 1579 Resigned)
Tiberio Carafa (1579–1588 Died)
Owen Lewis (1588–1595 Died)
Giulio Caracciolo  (1597–1599 Died)
Bonifazio Caetani (1599–1613 Appointed Archbishop of Taranto)
Diego de Arce (Deodata de Arze), O.F.M. Obs. (1614–1617 Died)
Paolo Palombo, C.R. (1617–1648 Died)
Gregorio Carafa, C.R. (1648–1664)
Alfonso de Balmaseda, O.S.A. (16 June 1670 – 25 September 1673)
Giovanni Battista del Tinto, O. Carm. (1676–1685 Died)
Francisco de Sequeiros y Sotomayor, O.S.A. (1 April 1686 – 1691 Died)
Vincenzo de Magistris (del Maestro), O.P. (1692–1705 Died)

1700–1900

Nicolò Rocco (1707–1726 Died)
Gennaro Fortunato (1729–1751 Died)
Giovanni Battista Miceli (1752–1763 Died)
Giovanni Battista Coppola (1763–1797 Died)
Sede vacante (1797–1818)
[Francesco Antonio Grillo, O.F.M. Conv. (7 November 1804 Died)]
Adeodato Gomez Cardosa (26 June 1818 – 19 December 1825)
Michele Bombini (1829–1871 Died)
Alessandro Maria Basile, C.SS.R. (1871–1883 Died)
Raffaele Danise, M.I. (1883 – 24 March 1884)
Antonio Pistocchi  (1884–1888 Died)
Evangelista (Michael Antonio) di Milia, O.F.M. Cap. (11 February 1889 – 13 November 1898)
Antonio Maria Bonito  (1899–1905)<ref>Bonito was appointed Coadjutor Archbishop of Amalfi; he succeeded to the Archbishopric on 17 June 1907. He retired  and was named titular Archbishop of Axum (Sudan) on 5 August 1910.  Acta Apostolicae Sedis III (Rome 1911), p. 593. Annuario Pontificio (Rome 1916), p. 217.</ref>

since 1900
Pietro La Fontaine (1906–1910 Appointed Secretary of the Congregation of (Sacred) Rites)
Giuseppe Bartolomeo Rovetta  (1911–1920 Resigned)
Bruno Occhiuto (1921–1937 Died)
Raffaele Barbieri (1937–1968 Died)
Domenico Vacchiano (1970–1978 Appointed Prelate of Pompei o Beatissima Vergine Maria del Santissimo Rosario)
Girolamo Grillo (1979–1983 Appointed Bishop of Tarquinia e Civitavecchia)
Giovanni Francesco Pala (1984–1987 Died)
Andrea Mugione (1988–1998 Appointed Archbishop of Crotone-Santa Severina)
Domenico Graziani (1999–2006 Appointed Archbishop of Crotone-Santa Severina)
Vincenzo Bertolone, S.d.P. (2007–2011 Appointed Archbishop of Catanzaro-Squillace)
Nunzio Galantino (9 December 2011 – 28 February 2015)
Francesco Savino (2015– )

Auxiliary Bishops
Pedro Torres (bishop) (1540– )

References

Books
References
  (in Latin)
 
 
 

Studies

Duchesne, Louis (1902), "Les évèchés de Calabre," 
Kamp, Norbert (1975). Kirche und Monarchie im staufischen Königreich Sizilien: I. Prosopographische Grundlegung, Bistumer und  Bistümer und Bischöfe des Konigreichs 1194–1266: 2. Apulien und Calabrien München: Wilhelm Fink 1975.
Kehr, Paulus Fridolin (1975). Italia pontificia. Regesta pontificum Romanorum.'' Vol. X: Calabria–Insulae.  Berlin: Weidmann. (in Latin)

External links
 GCatholic

Roman Catholic dioceses in Calabria
Dioceses established in the 5th century
Cassano all'Ionio